You Can't Stop the Murders is a 2003 Australian comedy film directed by Anthony Mir and written by and starring Mir, Gary Eck and Akmal Saleh. The plot revolves around a series of Village People-themed murders in a small town, and the police who investigate the crimes.  The title is a satirical reference to the 1980 film Can't Stop the Music, in which the Village People star.

Plot

Eck and Saleh play two police constables in a rural village, 'Gary' and 'Akmal' who lead fairly unremarkable lives.  Gary's main aim is to be crowned line dancing champion of the village, having always been the runner-up. A series of horrific murders, involving the mutilation of bodies, rock the town, and 'Tony' (Mir), a detective from the city, is called in reluctantly to investigate.  Whilst the young Akmal is in awe of the dashing detective, Tony's aggressive methods clash with the uptight Gary, and 'Chief Carter' (Richard Carter), the officer in charge of the station.  Tony is eventually sent back to the city, after shooting a French male stripper.

Gary and Akmal soon discover that the murders have a Village People theme, with those murdered having been in one of the occupations of a Village Person, or resembling one.  They fearfully deduce that either a policeman or a dentist (Akmal is uncertain, as he doesn't clearly remember the Village People, although Gary quickly deduces that it is, in fact, a policeman) will be next to die, as does Tony, who rushes back from the city.

Production
The film stars a number of Australian stand-up comedians including Jimeoin, Bob Franklin, The Umbilical Brothers, Kitty Flanagan, Garry Who, Haskel Daniel, Richard Carter, The Dickster, Rash Ryder, Kenny Graham and Sandman.

Box office
You Can't Stop the Murders grossed $254,871 at the box office in Australia.

See also
 Cinema of Australia

References

External links
 
 You Cant Stop The Murders at the National Film and Sound Archive
 

2003 films
2000s crime comedy films
2000s comedy thriller films
Australian crime comedy films
Australian comedy thriller films
Cultural depictions of the Village People
Films about murder
Films set in Australia
Films shot in Australia
2003 comedy films
2000s English-language films
2000s Australian films